Kornweg is a station on the Alster Valley line, located in Ohlsdorf, Hamburg, Germany. It is served by the trains of Hamburg S-Bahn lines S1 and S11. The station was opened in 1918.

History 
The station was opened in 1918, and electrified in 1924.

Service 
The lines S1 and S11 of Hamburg S-Bahn call at Kornweg station.

Gallery

See also 

 Hamburger Verkehrsverbund (HVV)
 List of Hamburg S-Bahn stations

References

External links 

 Line and route network plans at hvv.de 

Hamburg S-Bahn stations in Hamburg
Buildings and structures in Hamburg-Nord
Railway stations in Germany opened in 1918